Damien Touya (born 23 April 1975) is a French fencer. He won medals at three Olympics. He won a gold medal at the 2004 Summer Olympics in Athens, in the team sabre, together with Julien Pillet and his brother Gaël Touya.

References

External links

1975 births
Living people
French male sabre fencers
Olympic fencers of France
Olympic gold medalists for France
Olympic silver medalists for France
Olympic bronze medalists for France
Fencers at the 1996 Summer Olympics
Fencers at the 2000 Summer Olympics
Fencers at the 2004 Summer Olympics
Olympic medalists in fencing
Sportspeople from La Rochelle
Medalists at the 1996 Summer Olympics
Medalists at the 2000 Summer Olympics
Medalists at the 2004 Summer Olympics
Chevaliers of the Légion d'honneur